Aiko Sato may refer to:

, Japanese writer
, Japanese actress
, Japanese judoka